Daniel Hanley (17 May 1883 – 1 December 1976) was an Australian rules footballer who played with Essendon in the Victorian Football League (VFL).

Before he came to Essendon, Hanley played his football at South Ballarat. He was used mostly as a defender during his VFL career but also spent some time as a follower. A premiership player in both 1911 and 1912, he remained with Essendon until the conclusion of the 1914 season when he was suspended for eight matches in the penultimate game of the year. He did not return the following season and instead joined the army with whom he served overseas.

Hanley was involved in a controversial incident in 1912 when he alleged that he had been deliberately impeded by a boundary umpire. His allegation was that when he was on the boundary line competing against a Collingwood player for the ball, the umpire grasped him by the hand, thus preventing him from taking part in the contest. The umpire was not punished due to a lack of witnesses.

References

Holmesby, Russell and Main, Jim (2007). The Encyclopedia of AFL Footballers. 7th ed. Melbourne: Bas Publishing.

External links

1883 births
Australian rules footballers from Victoria (Australia)
Essendon Football Club players
Essendon Football Club Premiership players
South Ballarat Football Club players
1976 deaths
Golden Point Football Club players
Australian military personnel of World War I
Two-time VFL/AFL Premiership players
Military personnel from Victoria (Australia)